Younger or Youngers may refer to:

People
 Younger (surname)
 List of people known as the Elder or the Younger

Arts and entertainment
 Younger, an American novel by Pamela Redmond Satran
 Younger (TV series), an American sitcom based on the novel
 "Younger" (Seinabo Sey song), 2013
 "Younger" (Ruel song), 2018
 "Younger" (Jonas Blue and Hrvy song), 2019
 Youngers, a British teen drama
 "Younger", a song by Dala from Everyone Is Someone, 2009
 "Younger", a song by Imagine Dragons from Mercury – Acts 1 & 2, 2022
 "Younger", a song by Olly Murs from You Know I Know, 2018
 the Younger family, fictional characters in the play A Raisin in the Sun

Other uses
 Younger v. Harris, a decision of the United States Supreme Court
 Younger Hall, the main music venue in St Andrews, Scotland
 Viscount Younger of Leckie, title in the Peerage of the United Kingdom
 Younger (title), the title traditionally given to the heir apparent to a laird
 Youngers, Missouri, a community in the United States
 Youngers Beer, the common name for brewery William Younger & Co